The 1998 Campeonato Ecuatoriano de Fútbol de la Serie A was the 40th season of the Serie A, the top level of professional football in Ecuador. LDU Quito won their fifth national championship.

Format
The format for 1998 is unique to this season in terms of competition format and awarding of points after results.

The season was divided into two tournaments, the Apertura and the Clausura, each with similar formats. The first phases of each tournament were different. For the Apertura, the twelves teams competed against each in a double round-robin format, once at home and once away. The top-four teams were put in Group 1 for the second phase, the next four were put into Group 2, and the bottom-four were put into Group 3. In the Clausura, the twelve teams were placed into two groups of six. Within this those groups, the teams competed against each other in a double round-robin format, once at home and once away. At the end, the top-two teams from each group were placed into Group 1, the middle-two teams from each group were placed into Group 2, and the bottom-two teams from each group were placed into Group 3.

The second phases of each tournament are identical. In each group, the four teams competed against each other in a double round-robin format for different objectives. Teams in Group 1 competed for a spot in the championship final and a berth in the 1999 Copa Libertadores. Teams in Group 2 competed for a spot in the 1999 Copa CONMEBOL playoff (to be played the following season). Teams in Group 3 competed to avoid relegation.

Relegation is determined at the end of the Clausura and would only involve teams who had played in either Group 3. Teams who played in Group 3 of either tournament earned negative points depending on their position at the end of group play. The two teams who had the most negative points were relegated to the Serie B for the next season.

The championship playoff was contested between the two winners of each tournament's Group 1 on a home and a way basis.

The points system was different for this season. If a game ended in a draw, each team would earn the normal one point. However, a penalty shootout will ensue at the end of regulation. The winner of the penalty shootout would earn an extra point.

Torneo Apertura

First phase

Second phase

Group 1
</onlyinclude>

Group 2

Group 3

Torneo Clausura

First phase

Hexagonal 1

Hexagonal 2

Second phase

Group 1

Group 2

Group 3

Relegation

Championship playoff

External links
Official website 
1998 season on RSSSF

1998
Ecu
Football